Hutton's shearwater (Puffinus huttoni) or the kaikōura tītī, is a medium-sized ocean-going seabird in the family Procellariidae. Its range is Australian and New Zealand waters, but it breeds only in mainland New Zealand.  Its conservation status is Endangered, because there are just two remaining breeding colonies, located in the Seaward Kaikōura Range. Six other shearwater colonies have been wiped out by introduced pigs. Hutton's shearwater is the only seabird in the world that is known to breed in alpine areas.  Conservation measures for the bird include community initiatives to rescue birds that crash-land at night on streets in Kaikōura,  and the establishment of a protected area on the Kaikōura Peninsula including a predator-proof fence, man-made burrows, and translocating fledglings from the remaining colonies.

Description 
The bird's name commemorates Frederick Hutton, a former curator of the Canterbury Museum in Christchurch, New Zealand. A medium-sized (350 g) seabird, with a 75 cm wingspan, it is brown with a white underbelly and brown collar, dark borders to the underwing, dark grey bill, and pinkish dark-webbed feet; it can be distinguished from fluttering shearwater by its dark grey "armpits". At a breeding colony it has a loud cackling call.

Ecology 
Hutton's shearwater feeds in the open ocean largely on small fish and krill, diving up to 20 m. Puffinus huttoni have long bills, which are adapted to catch prey more or less underwater by plunging from a few meters above the surface or by paddling slowly forwards searching with their head submerged, then diving using partly opened wings for propulsion.

Distribution 
. 
These birds live entirely at sea except when breeding. During the September–March (spring and summer) breeding season, adults migrate to New Zealand waters; there have been individual sightings around the entire New Zealand coast, but most birds are feeding off the eastern South Island, especially between Cook Strait and Banks Peninsula. Large flocks can be seen off the Kaikōura coast during summer. Outside the breeding season, they are mostly found in Australian waters. Geo-locators fitted on young birds revealed some circumnavigate Australia in an anti-clockwise direction in the 4–5 years leading up to sexual maturity.

Breeding 

Uniquely amongst seabirds, Hutton's shearwater breed in the sub-alpine to alpine zones, in burrows at an altitude of 1200–1800 m. They formerly bred in both the Seaward and Inland Kaikōura mountains in historic times, and Māori collected the young "muttonbirds" for food. Their breeding is restricted to only two remaining colonies in the Seaward Kaikōura Range, one of over 100,000 pairs at the head of the Kowhai River, and one small (8000 pair) colony on private land at Shearwater Stream. Although the species was scientifically described in 1912, its breeding colonies were only rediscovered by Geoff Harrow in 1964. Burrows are dug into steep tussock slopes at a density of 1 per 2 m2. One white egg is laid in November and incubated for 50 days; chicks take around 80 days to fledge.

Conservation 
The eight breeding colonies discovered in 1964 have been reduced to two, known now as the Kowhai Valley and Shearwater Stream Important Bird Area; the other lower-altitude colonies were destroyed by feral introduced pigs. The breeding birds' main predators are introduced stoats, which kill about 0.25% of adults and 12% of chicks each year in their nesting burrows. The overall growth rate is still positive, though, so stoats are not considered a major threat.

Some parts of the colonies are in steep, unstable sites. The browsing of deer, goats, and pigs in these steep areas has contributed to erosion, which has damaged the Hutton's shearwater burrows and the population. However, control of pigs has led to better vegetation cover at the colonies and lessened destruction of burrows.

As a further conservation measure, in 2005 a new colony (Te Rae o Atiu) was established on the Kaikōura Peninsula. First, a small transfer of 10 nestlings was sent in April 2005. After that, roughly 100 additional nestlings were moved annually each March in 2006, 2007, 2008, 2012 and 2013. Chicks translocated from the Kowhai colony were hand-fed in artificial burrows to ensure they would imprint on the new colony, and since 2010 have been returning there to breed. A predator-proof fence was built around the  site in February 2010 by the Hutton's Shearwater Charitable Trust.

The 2016 Kaikōura earthquake caused landslides in the largest remaining breeding colony at Kowhai Valley, and occurred during the breeding season.  Initial reports indicated a loss of half of the colony.  Subsequent work in 2017 indicated the loss was 20-30% of breeding burrows, but that there was a lot of bird activity observed in the nesting areas.

As at 2017, the estimated population size is 600,000 individuals, including 150,000 breeding pairs. Current estimates suggest that earlier studies significantly under-reported the population. However, both of the remaining breeding colonies are vulnerable to predators or erosion.

Hutton's shearwaters are nocturnal, and can be disoriented by bright lights at night.  This has led to problems with adult and newly-fledged birds crash-landing in the streets of Kaikōura at night.  During the season when the fledgling birds leave their mountain burrows, volunteers in Kaikōura patrol the streets, looking for birds that have crash-landed on roads in the town. The young birds are usually unable to take off again, making them vulnerable to being run over by vehicles or succumbing to predation by dogs or cats. In 2015, over two successive nights, there were 200 birds found crash-landed in the town.  A new facility, the Hutton's Hub, was opened in 2016 adjacent to the Department of Conservation office, as a place for the community to bring in crash-landed birds.  Any birds that can be rescued are taken to a rehabilitation centre for later release at sea. The community volunteer programme results in around 80% of the crash-landed birds being successfully released.

A new initiative has been launched to apply for recognition as an international dark sky reserve in the Kaikōura area. This could reduce the problems that lighting causes for Hutton's shearwaters. The Kaikōura District Council has already modified streetlighting, to reduce the risk to the birds. In April 2022, the Mayor of Kaikōura said that the dark sky reserve initiative had the full support of the council, and would be a boost to tourist numbers, especially during the winter period.

Gallery

References

Bibliography

External links

 The Hutton's Shearwater Charitable Trust
 RNZ podcast (2008): Interview with Geoff Harrow - discovery of Hutton's shearwater colonies
 RNZ podcast (2013): Hutton's shearwater translocation
 RNZ podcast (2016): Critter of the Week - Hutton's shearwater
 BirdLife species factsheet
 Hutton's shearwater, New Zealand Birds Online
 Video: Meet the Locals: Hutton's shearwater peninsula colony, TVNZ production (2011)
 Video: Mystery bird, Science Communication production (2012)

Hutton's shearwater
Birds of New Zealand
Hutton's shearwater
Taxonomy articles created by Polbot
Kaikōura District